Markquese Bell (born January 6, 1999) is an American football safety for the Dallas Cowboys of the National Football League (NFL). He played college football at Florida A&M.

Early life and high school
Bell grew up in Bridgeton, New Jersey and attended Bridgeton High School. He was rated a four-star recruit and committed to play college football at Maryland over offers from Ohio State, Rutgers, and Virginia.

College career
Bell began his college career at Maryland and joined the team as an early enrollee. He was suspended entering his freshman season due to a violation of the team's code of conduct. Bell ultimately withdrew from the school before ever playing in a game for the Terrapins. He then transferred to Coffeyville Community College for the 2018 season and made 52 tackles with two interceptions. After the season, Bell transferred to Florida A&M for his remaining collegiate eligibility.

Professional career

Bell signed with the Dallas Cowboys as an undrafted free agent on May 1, 2022. He made the Cowboys' initial 53-man roster out of training camp.

References

External links
Florida A&M Rattlers bio
Dallas Cowboys bio

1999 births
Living people
Players of American football from New Jersey
American football safeties
Bridgeton High School alumni
Dallas Cowboys players
Florida A&M Rattlers football players
Coffeyville Red Ravens football players
People from Bridgeton, New Jersey
Sportspeople from Cumberland County, New Jersey